Aspasia silvana is a species of orchid, exclusively and endemic in the eastern Brazilian Serra do Mar mountains, from Rio de Janeiro to Bahia. It forms large colonies, however, being not a particularly common species, it is just occasionally found, mostly on areas of transition between shady forest and open areas both in rain forests and cloud montane forests.

References

External links 

silvana
Endemic orchids of Brazil
Orchids of Bahia
Orchids of Rio de Janeiro (state)
Plants described in 1988